Jay Wolfe (born April 5, 1955) is an American business owner and former State Senator, and U.S. Senate candidate.

Early life, education, and business career 
Wolfe was born in Parkersburg, West Virginia to Donald and Emogene Moore Wolfe. He graduated from Parkersburg South High School in 1973. He attended Marshall University and graduated from Glenville State College in 1977 with a degree in business administration.

He owns Wolfe Rentals LLC and Wolfe-Furner Insurance Inc.

Political career 
In the 1980s, Wolfe was elected to one term in the West Virginia Senate. He was also a member of the Harrison County and State Republican Executive Committees.

1988 U.S. Senate campaign 

Wolfe lost to incumbent Democrat but with the highest percentage of any other opponent of Robert C. Byrd. Byrd outspent Wolfe $3 million to $200,000.

2002 U.S. Senate campaign 

Wolfe lost to incumbent Democrat Jay Rockefeller. Rockefeller outspent Wolfe $5 million to $150,000.

2008 U.S. Senate campaign 

Wolfe lost a rematch to Rockefeller in a nearly identical margin but with Rockefeller spending more than he did in 2002.

Electoral history 

 
 

|-
| 
| colspan=5 |Democratic hold
|-

Personal life 
He married his high school girlfriend, Mollie. They have been married for over 40 years. He has four children and ten grandchildren.

References

Republican Party West Virginia state senators
Living people
1963 births
Politicians from Clarksburg, West Virginia
Businesspeople from West Virginia
Politicians from Parkersburg, West Virginia
Glenville State College alumni